Nemapogon cyprica is a moth of the family Tineidae. It is found on Cyprus.

References

Moths described in 1986
Nemapogoninae